The Intellectual Property Office of Singapore (IPOS) is a statutory board under the Ministry of Law of the Government of Singapore. IPOS advises on and administers intellectual property (IP) laws, promotes IP awareness, and provides the infrastructure to facilitate the development of IP in Singapore.

IPOS has been appointed an International Searching Authority (ISA) and International Preliminary Examining Authority (IPEA) for patent applications filed in accordance with the Patent Co-operation Treaty since 9 October 2015.

Conventions 
Singapore is a member of the following international conventions:

 Paris Convention
 Berne Convention for the Protection of Literary and Artistic Works
 Madrid Protocol
 Nice Agreement
 Patent Cooperation Treaty
 Budapest Treaty
 WIPO Copyright Treaty
 WIPO Performances and Phonograms Treaty
 International Convention for the Protection of New Varieties of Plants otherwise known as the "UPOV Convention"
 The Geneva Act (1999) of the Hague Agreement concerning the International Registration of Industrial Design
 Singapore Treaty on the Law of Trademarks

See also 
 List of patent offices

References

External links 
 

2001 establishments in Singapore
Government agencies established in 2001
International Searching and Preliminary Examining Authorities
Intellectual property organizations
Patent offices
Statutory boards of the Singapore Government
Regulation in Singapore